Variations of Australian rules football are games or activities based on or similar to the game of Australian rules football, in which the player uses common Australian rules football skills.  They range in player numbers from 2 (in the case of kick-to-kick) up to the minimum 38 required for a full Australian rules football.

Some are essentially identical to Australian rules football, with only minor rule changes, while others are more distant and arguably not simple variations but distinct games.  Others still have adapted to the unavailability of full-sized cricket fields. Other variations include children's games, contests or activities intended to help the player practice or reinforce skills, which may or may not have a competitive aspect.

Most of the variations are played in informal settings, without the presence of umpires and sometimes without strict adherence to official game rules.

Participatory varieties

Auskick

Auskick is a program developed in Australia in the 1980s and promote participation in Australian rules football amongst children, particularly of primary school age and under. It has proven to be popular with both boys and girls. At its peak in the mid-1990s there were around 200,000 Auskick participants annually. The program is now run throughout the world, including several locally branded variations such as: "Kiwi Kick" (AFL New Zealand), "Niukick" (Papua New Guinea), "Footy Wild" (South Africa), "Bula Kick" (Fiji), "Viking Kick" (Denmark) and "Ausball" (United States) among others.

Auskick has its roots in the Little League which began to be played at half time during VFL matches in the 1960s and was revised in 1980 to make it more accessible. Little League was expanded by Ray Allsop into a state development program called Vickick begun in Victoria in 1985. Urged by former player David Parkin in 1995 as a means of keeping the sport viable long term in the Australian Capital Territory it was adopted by the AFL Commission the national governing body for the sport, which began to roll it out nationally from 1998. Numerous professional players are graduates of the Auskick program.

Women's Australian rules football

Women's Australian rules football is a fast-growing variation played by all-female teams that dates back to the 1910s. Since 2010, it has also been governed by the AFL Commission. Its highest levels of competition are the professional AFL Women's club competition in Australia and the Australian Football International Cup (women's division) worldwide representative competition. 

The women's game is also a contact sport, however over the course of its history it is sometimes played with modified rules including different player numbers (16 a side + 5 interchange), a smaller ball, and increased tackling restrictions. The women's variation is strongest in Australia (there are strong second level competitions in all Australian states), Ireland, Canada, the United States, United Kingdom, New Zealand and Japan and is also played at junior level in these and many other countries.

Amateurs

The Amateur version of the game is mostly similar though its main differences are that it strictly forbids player payments and has some rule variations which encourage participation for amateur players. Amateurs is strongest in the heartland states of the sport in Australia: Victoria, South Australia and Western Australia, though there are competitions in most Australian states. The Amateur version is governed by the Australian Amateur Football Council. Notable rule differences include the order-off rule which has been a feature of play since the 1930s, and the use of a shorter distance penalty, the 25-metre penalty, among others, including shorter quarters and increased numbers of interchange players for some grades. The Australian Football International Cup, while being run by the AFL Commission, has for most of its history been aligned with Amateur rules acknowleding the fact that most of the leagues outside of Australia were until recently dominated by amateur players.

Masters Australian Football

Masters Australian Football (also known as "Superules" or derisively as "Superfools") is an amateur social variation for players aged 35 years and over. The sport first commenced officially on 21 September 1980 in Ballarat, Victoria. Masters matches are typically classified by age grades: Supers (35+ years); Masters: (40+ years) and Seniors: (45+ years); Super Seniors (50+) and Super Veterans (55+) and some matches either do or don't allow mixing between these age groups. Masters leagues often also incorporate rules from Amateurs football.

The game varies from open age football particular in modifications aimed at reduce the physical impact of the game on older players and reduce the volunteer burden on officials. Umpires do not bounce the ball and there are often no boundary umpires.  There are less interchange restrictions and players are not permitted to raise their knees in aerial contests, or make contact with the knee or boot, which could potentially damage the weaker backs of older players.

Some Masters competitions add bonus points for a long range Super goal (9 points 6 plus 3 behinds).

It is played by over 119 teams throughout Australia and around the world. There is also an Australian National Championships, while internationally, Masters is more often be played in the Nines (9-a-side) format.

Lightning football

Lightning football is a generic term to describe variations of the game played over a shortened length, usually about half of the length of a full match. Lightning football may be played under otherwise unchanged rules, but in recent lightning matches staged by the AFL, experimental rules such as awarding a free kick against the last player to touch the ball before it goes out of bounds have been trialled.

Lightning matches are often used, particularly at junior or amateur level, to play an entire tournament inside a single day or weekend. These tournaments are typically known as "lightning premierships" or "lightning carnivals".

During the COVID-19 pandemic the AFL significantly shortened premiership matches for the 2020 AFL season arguing it needed to for its pandemic fixture scheduling leading to some branding the 16 minute quarter format 'fast food footy'. Some argued the AFL's move was an effort to make the game more appealing to the media and fans. Nevertheless, the move was criticised and the AFL reverted to the full length format for the 2021 AFL season.

Wheelchair
The wheelchair variation of AFL (known as "Wheelchair Aussie Rules" or "Wheelchair AFL") is a parasport designed to play in sports wheelchairs. Kicking is replaced by handballing (a mark is awarded for catching the ball within 3 metres), while handballing is replaced by throwing. Like other varieties tackling is replaced by touching and players are divided into zones. Goals and behinds are used for scoring, however with shorter distances between the posts. There are leagues operating in all states and territories of Australia, with Victorian clubs aligned with AFL clubs, operating since 2018.

Modified field or player numbers

9-a-side

9-a-side Footy is played informally by Aussie Rules clubs but not yet an official sport in its own right. The AFL sanctioned version is known as "AFL 9s".

9-a-side games are sometimes played on half size fields that are typically rectangular with 9 players on the field at any one time, typically consisting of three forwards, three backs and three centre players. Often two games are played at the same time on a single Australian rules or cricket field. At other times, 9-a-side makes use of the full space of the field when a full complement of players is not available. This variety is a more open and running variety of Australian rules.

A minimum of 18 players are required in total, but many teams field unlimited interchange benches.

Rules are the same as Australian rules football. Limited and non-contact versions of 9-a-side football are also played by both men's and women's leagues.

Examples of official tournaments held under these rules include the EU Cup and Bali Nines.

AFLX

Another prominent variation of the game is AFLX. The game is played on soccer-sized pitches and features seven players a side, as well as several other rules designed to speed up the game. Between 2018 and 2019 it was used in an official Australian Football League sanctioned pre-season event.

Samoa Rules
Samoa Rules is a game derived from Australian rules football that has also been played in Samoa. The game is played on rugby fields and each team consists of 15 players per side.

Unlike Australian rules football, player movement is restricted to zones (similarly to Rec Footy). There is a line across the centre that backs and forwards can not cross. Onballers are allowed to go anywhere.

The Vailima Six-Shooters' Championship began in Samoa in 1998 under these rules, becoming known as "Samoa Rules". A number of Samoa Rules players went on to represent Samoa in the Samoan national Australian rules football team, known as the "Bulldogs".

Metro Footy
Metro Footy (or Metro Rules Footy) is a modified version of Australian rules football rules played on gridiron football, rugby or Association football fields, predominantly in the United States of America.  The reasons for the development of Metro Footy was partly due to there being few grounds large enough for traditional Australian rules matches, but also to allow competitive football to be played with smaller playing numbers, allowing for better recruitment possibilities.

Teams typically consist of 9-a-side on a  field.  The teams that play feed into larger 18-a-side Australian rules representative teams that participate in leagues such as the MAAFL or tournaments such as the USAFL National Championships and also provide the opportunity to introduce new American players to the game of Australian rules football.

Several clubs from the United States Australian Football League participate in Metro Footy.

Historical variations

VFA rules (1938–1949)

VFA rules (or "Association rules" or "throw-pass rules") variation of Australian rules football was a distinct set of rules which was played in the Victorian Football Association, and several other smaller competitions which elected to switch to the new rules, between 1938 and 1949. Although there were several other small differences between the VFA's rules and the national rules, the primary distinguishing feature was that throwing the ball from below the shoulders with two hands was a legal form of handpass – known as a throw-pass – under the VFA's rules. The ease of throw-passing compared with traditional handpassing resulted in the VFA's code fostering a faster playing style with fewer stoppages and more run-and-carry than was seen under the traditional rules at the time. The VFA's code operated as a rival to the national code throughout the 1940s, and some innovations of the VFA's code were incorporated into the national code over that time. The VFA reverted to playing under the national rules from the 1950 season, and the throw-pass rules have not been seen since.

Recreational varieties

AFL 9s
AFL 9s is the AFL's official touch Nine-a-side footy variant since 2016 addressing many of the criticisms of the earlier Rec Footy. It varies from Australian Rules Football mainly in that it is played with 9 players on a smaller field with a smaller ball, rewards female players in mixed competition for example with a higher score for goals, the ball must not touch the ground, marking is protected by a drop-zone and only designated forwards can kick goals. It allows running with the ball (limited to one running bounce) and freedom of movement around the field giving athletes more opportunity to have an impact on the game and compensate for lower skill level of other players. AFL 9s offers mixed, as well as all-male and all-female competitions to lower the barriers to entry for participation. As a recreational game AFL 9s has proved popular with both new and established Australian rules players with 24,032 participants in Australia in 2019 at least a third of which are female. Its popularity as a social game with Australian rules players is such that ex-professional players are sometimes seen participating in social competitions.

Force Back

Force Back (also known as Force 'em back, Force Them Back, Forcing Back, Forcey Backs or Forcings Back) is a game played by school students usually in primary, middle or high school, particularly in Australia and  New Zealand, at lunch or recess as a codified variant of kick-to-kick. It is played with football (typically oblique spheroid shaped or sometimes round). While not officially an Australian rules football variant it shares a significant skill set with Australian rules football including kicking, aim, distance control, running and catching and is often played with an Australian rules ball. The rules are usually modified by students themselves, depending on what environment they are playing on. While there are no standard rules, the game is increasingly codified and endorsed as a recreational school age game by various sports bodies including the Australian Football League and AFL New Zealand.

Rec Footy

Recreational Football (also known as Rec Footy or Recreational Footy) was a non-contact version sanctioned by the AFL first codified in 2003. Rec Footy was played by 8 a side with players confined to 3 zones wearing bibs to signify their zone, the ball had to move through all 3 zones in order to score and only forwards could score. Tags were used to substitute tackling and players when marking were allocated a drop-zone which opponents could not enter. If the ball hit the ground, it would be a turnover to the opposite team of the player who last touched it. Players could take a maximum of 3 steps before disposing of the ball. Rec Footy was heavily criticised mainly by Australian rules players for appearing similar to netball, too restrictive on movement by enforcing strict zones and field positions, penalising athletes and reducing fitness benefits, lacking the ability for skilled footballers to use skills like bouncing and long kicking and play naturally whilst also penalising newer unskilled players with frequent turnovers. Falling participation rates and a large increase in Australian football female contact participation led to social competitions being restructured and rebranded as AFL 9s in 2011.

Kick-to-Kick

Kick-to-kick is a pastime, a well-known tradition of Australian rules football fans, and a recognised Australian term for kick and catch type games. A common format is for one person in a group to kick to a second group; whoever marks the ball kicks it back to the first group. In its "markers up" form, it is the usual casual version of Australian rules (similar to the relationship between backyard/beach cricket and the established forms of cricket).

Although not a sport in itself, the term is used to describe a social exercise played in parks, fields, streets and back yards, and requires at least two people.

Touch Aussie Rules
Touch Aussie Rules is a non-tackle variation played in London, UK and was organised by Aussie Rules UK.

All skills are used in Touch Aussie Rules, including kicking, marking, handballing and bouncing.

Hybrid codes

International Rules Football

International rules football (also known as inter rules in Australia and compromise rules in Ireland) is a hybrid code of football, which was first codified in 1967 to facilitate international representative matches between Australian rules football players and Gaelic football players and is played between them worldwide.

Austus

Austus is a sport which was started in Australia during World War II when United States soldiers wanted to play football against the Australians. The game combined features of Australian rules football and American football. The rules of the game were mostly the same as Australian rules football, except that the American-style forward pass was allowed and afforded the same benefits as an Australian rules football kick, meaning that a thrown ball could be marked or used to score goals. The name comes from the first four letters of Australia (AUST) and the initials of the United States (US). The game has rarely, if ever, been played since the war.

Samoan rules

A hybrid of rugby union and Aussie rules.

Universal Football

Universal football was a proposed hybrid sport of Australian rules football and rugby league, as a means of unifying Australia under a single dominant football code. First codified in 1914, the game was originally designed to be played by teams of 15 on rectangular fields with rugby-style goalposts featuring a crossbar. The off-side rules of rugby league applied within in the forward quarter of the ground and did not apply elsewhere. Handpasses, which included throws, could only be made backwards. Rugby scrums were eliminated and replaced with the Australian rules football style ball-up. Players could be tackled anywhere between the knee and the shoulders. The Australian rules style of mark was kept. Tries were worth three points, conversions and goals from marks kicked over the crossbar were worth one point, and goals kicked on the run were worth two points.

There was some progress towards amalgamating the two sports in 1915, but these were halted by the escalation of World War I and the new code was not revived after the war ended. The concept was briefly revisited in 1933 with similar rules, and a private trial match was played at the Sydney Showground, but it did not result in a lasting revival of the concept which has not been seen since.

References

 
Australian rules football